Daniel Srb (born 23 November 1964) is a Croatian right-wing politician and president of the Croatian Party of Rights.

Early life and education
Srb was born in Osijek on 23 November 1964.
He graduated from the Faculty of Engineering and Shipbuilding at the University of Zagreb. He was a teacher at EMŠC in Osijek in 1991, later he taught at KBC Osijek.

Political career
Since 1990 he has been an active politician. In 1992 he joined the Croatian Party of Rights. 

He held different municipal positions in Osijek. He was a member of the Osijek Assembly for eight years. In 2005 he became the Deputy Prefect of the Osijek-Baranja County and from 2007-08 he was an employee at DS Consulting. He worked as the Assistant Director of Osijek's Clinical Hospital. 

On 6 February 2009, he became a member of the Sabor to succeed Anto Đapić. He was the vice-president of the party until 7 November 2009, when he replaced Đapić.

Srb's main effort initially was to remove negative connotations associated with his party left by Đapić. Srb is known for his staunch euroscepticism, as his party was the only party represented in the Croatian Parliament that opposed  membership in the European Union. He condemned the convictions of Ante Gotovina and Mladen Markač (which were later overturned) by the ICTY.

Personal life
He is married and has three children. For seven times he was a champion of Croatia in rowing. He was the president of Rowing Club "Iktus" based in Osijek for ten years before stepping down in September 2013.

References

External links
Daniel Srb profile, sabor.hr 
Predsjednik HSP-a, hsp.hr; 

Croatian Party of Rights politicians
Representatives in the modern Croatian Parliament
People from Osijek
Living people
1964 births
Croatian sports executives and administrators